Novi Miljanovci is a village in the municipalities of Usora and Tešanj, Bosnia and Herzegovina.

Demographics 
According to the 2013 census, its population was 2,035, with 1,999 living in the Tešanj part and 36 living in the Usora part.

References

Populated places in Tešanj
Populated places in Usora